Muhammad Rizwan or Mohammad Rizwan may refer to:
Mohammad Rizwan (cricketer), (born 1992) Pakistani international cricketer
Mohammad Rizwan (politician), (born 1953) Indian politician
Muhammad Rizwan Jr., (born 1994) Pakistani field hockey player
Muhammad Rizwan Sr., (born 1989) Pakistani field hockey player
 Muhammad Rizwan (kabaddi) Pakistani kabaddi player
 Muhammad Rizwan (officer) Pakistani civil servant